The 1966–67 season was Colchester United's 25th season in their history and their first back in the third tier of English football, the Third Division, following promotion from the Fourth Division the previous season. Alongside competing in the Third Division, the club also participated in the FA Cup and the League Cup.

Colchester finished comfortably mid-table by finishing 13th. Queens Park Rangers defeated the U's 5–0 in the League Cup, while Peterborough United knocked them out in the second round of the FA Cup.

Season overview
Neil Franklin spent £4,000 to sign Ken Hodgson from Bournemouth in the summer, and alongside Peter Bullock, the pair amassed 31 goals between them. Meanwhile, Reg Stratton scored 24 league goals as Colchester ended their first season back in the Third Division with a mid-table 13th position finish.

Players

Transfers

In

 Total spending:  ~ £4,000

Out

Match details

Third Division

Results round by round

League table

Matches

League Cup

FA Cup

Squad statistics

Appearances and goals

|-
!colspan="14"|Players who appeared for Colchester who left during the season

|}

Goalscorers

Clean sheets
Number of games goalkeepers kept a clean sheet.

Player debuts
Players making their first-team Colchester United debut in a fully competitive match.

See also
List of Colchester United F.C. seasons

References

General
Books

Websites

Specific

1966-67
English football clubs 1966–67 season